The giraffe seahorse (Hippocampus camelopardalis) is a species of fish of the family Syngnathidae. It is found in coastal waters off of the south and east coasts of Africa, from South Africa to Tanzania, and possibly north to Kenya. It is expected to feed on small crustaceans, similar to other seahorses. This species is ovoviviparous, with males carrying eggs in a brood pouch before giving birth to live young. Major threats to this species could be habitat loss, through coastal development and pollution, and overexploitation through bycatch. Some other threats include human use by drying out the seahorse for traditional medicine or as a curio.

Some distinctive characteristics include dark spots, one on the top of the coronet or crown of the seahorse's head and some on the dorso-lateral surface of the seahorse. It has a prominent spine above its eye in both the female and male specimen.

References

Further reading 

 iNaturalist
 Encyclopedia of Life
 WoRMS
 iSeahorse
 IUCN Seahorse, Pipefish & Stickleback Specialist Group

Giraffe seahorse
Marine fauna of East Africa
Marine fauna of Southern Africa
Giraffe seahorse
Giraffe seahorse
Taxonomy articles created by Polbot